Forbes Korea Power Celebrity 40 is an annual list published by Forbes Korea magazine since 2009. It is a catalog of the top 40 most powerful celebrities in South Korea where personalities from sports, music, arts, film and television are ranked according to their professional achievements, media exposure, social media popularity, TV appearances and earnings from the past year.

Top 10 by year

2009

2010

2011

2012

2013

2014

2015

2016

2017

2018

2019

2020

2021

2022

References

External links
 Full list of individuals in the 2022 list 
Full list of individuals in the 2021 list 
Full list of individuals in the 2020 list 
Full list of individuals in the 2019 list 
Full list of individuals in the 2018 list 
Full list of individuals in the 2017 list 
Full list of individuals in the 2016 list 
Full list of individuals in the 2015 list 
Top 10 individuals in the 2014 list
Full list of individuals in the 2013 list  
Full list of individuals in the 2012 list  
Full list of individuals in the 2011 list  
Full list of individuals in the 2010 list  
Full list of individuals in the 2009 list  

Lists of 21st-century people
Annual magazine issues
Lists of celebrities
South Korean entertainers
Forbes lists